The 1906 Yorkshire Cup was the second in the Rugby Football League club tournament's history. It was a knock-out competition between (mainly professional) rugby league clubs from  the English county of Yorkshire. The actual area was at times increased to encompass other teams from  outside the  county such as Newcastle, Mansfield, Coventry, and even London (in the form of Acton & Willesden.

The Rugby League season always (until the onset of "Summer Rugby" in 1996) ran from around August-time through to around May-time and this competition always took place early in the season, in the Autumn, with the final taking place in (or just before) December (The only exception to this was when disruption of the fixture list was caused during, and immediately after, the two World Wars)

1906 was the second occasion on which the  Yorkshire Cup competition had been held.

This year there were two new clubs to contest the  final.

Bradford won the trophy  by beating Hull Kingston Rovers by the score of 8-5

The match was played at Belle Vue, in the City of Wakefield, now in West Yorkshire. The attendance was 10,500 and receipts were £286

Background 

Brighouse Rangers, Castleford (1896) and Normanton left the league and the three non league clubs from last season were not invited, but they were replaced by junior/amateur club New Blackpool. This resulted in an overall decrease of five clubs, leaving a total of fifteen entrants.

This, in turn, resulted in one bye in the first round.

Pontefract resigned after 8 league matches and their record was expunged, but by this time, they had played (and lost) in this competition.

Competition and Results

Round 1 
Involved  7 matches (with one bye) and 15 Clubs

Round 2 - Quarterfinals 
Involved 4 matches and 8 Clubs

Round 3 – semifinals  
Involved 2 matches and 4 Clubs

Final

Teams and scorers 

Scoring - Try = four points - Goal = two points - Drop goal = one point

The road to success

Notes and comments 
1 * This was a record score at the time in the competition

2 * New Blackpool is/was a junior/amateur club from  ? (possibly Leeds area - can anyone shed light on this ?)

3 * Belle Vue is the home ground of Wakefield Trinity with a capacity of approximately 12,500. The record attendance was 37,906 on the 21 March 1936 in the Challenge Cup semi-final between Leeds and Huddersfield

See also 
1906–07 Northern Rugby Football Union season
Rugby league county cups

References

External links
Saints Heritage Society
1896–97 Northern Rugby Football Union season at wigan.rlfans.com
Hull&Proud Fixtures & Results 1896/1897
Widnes Vikings - One team, one passion Season In Review - 1896-97
The Northern Union at warringtonwolves.org

RFL Yorkshire Cup
Yorkshire Cup